The Carroll–Hartshorn House is a historic First Period house at 572 Haverhill Street in Reading, Massachusetts.  Built c. 1700, it is one of the oldest buildings in Reading, set on an early route between Wakefield and Haverhill.  It has a classic two-story, five-bay, central-chimney plan, with a rear shed extension giving the house a saltbox appearance.  Its windows, some still with original surrounds, are narrower and taller than typical for the period.  The property was owned by generations of the Hartshorn family.

The house was listed on the National Register of Historic Places in 1984.

See also
National Register of Historic Places listings in Reading, Massachusetts
National Register of Historic Places listings in Middlesex County, Massachusetts

References

Houses on the National Register of Historic Places in Reading, Massachusetts
Houses completed in 1696
Houses in Reading, Massachusetts
1700 establishments in Massachusetts
1696 establishments in Massachusetts
Saltbox architecture in Massachusetts